Bergsmoen or Bergsmo is a village in the municipality of Grong in Trøndelag county, Norway. It has a single bus stop in the village center.

Bergsmo is the home of the Grong bygdemuseum.

References

Villages in Trøndelag
Grong